Michael Hauser (born 30 March 1972) is a Czech philosopher, translator and founder of the civic organization Socialist Circle, which he also chaired until 2014. He became a member of the Council of Česká televize in March 2014.

Life and work
Hauser studied philosophy at Charles University in Prague, and completed his dissertation, entitled Modernity and Negativity. Adorno's Perspective, in 2004. His primary fields of interest are critical theory, Western Marxism and Post-Marxism, and their relation to contemporary thought. He mostly deals with materialistic theory of the subject, ideas and universalism, praxis, concepts of transition and the theory of spectacular categories (or materialist hauntology). He is a fellow at the Department of Contemporary Continental Philosophy (Institute of Philosophy at the Academy of Arts of the Czech Republic), and also teaches at the Faculty of Education (Charles University). Since 2005, Hauser has published several academic books.

Hauser has made several translations into Czech, including The Ticklish Subject by Slavoj Žižek, and Dialectic of the Enlightenment. He published a number of articles, both academic (in Filosofický časopis, Décalages, An Althusser Studies Journal) and popular (Právo, A2, Literární noviny, A2larm and Deník referendum). In 2004, he founded Socialist Circle (later renamed as SOK – Association for Leftist Theory), an organization that seeks to reflect and promote contemporary leftist theory in the Czech environment and establish a common basis for interaction between philosophy, sociology, economy and art theory. The association held a number of conferences and public seminars, many of which included Hauser as a speaker, and also published translations of the works of Alain Badiou, Jacques Rancière or Slavoj Žižek. Alongside the focus on European philosophy, the association also concentrates on the Czech and Slovak leftist scene (Karel Kosík, Egon Bondy, Milan Machovec). In 2006, Hauser was among the leading figures of the Jsme občané! (We Are Citizens!) initiative, a critical public reflection of the shortcomings of liberal democracy in the Czech Republic. His current work includes the development of a materialist theory of the subject alternative to the conceptions of Alain Badiou and Slavoj Žižek, in the sense that it would relate the discussed issues to the tradition of Western Marxism (Adorno, Lukács, Althusser, Marx). Hauser also finds inspiration in Czech critical thinking (Karel Kosík, Robert Kalivoda, Milan Machovec). He first presented his conception in the book Ways out of Postmodernism.

In film
Hauser was one of the subjects of the Czech documentary feature, Hauser and Žižek: Theoreticians of Postmarxist Philosophy by Helena Všetečková.

Books
Adorno: moderna a negativita (Adorno: Modernity and Negativity), Prague: Filosofia, 2005.
Prolegomena k filosofii současnosti (Prolegomena to Contemporary Philosophy), Prague: Filosofia, 2007.
Sociální stát a kapitalismus (Welfare State and Capitalism, ed.), Prague: Svoboda servis, 2007.
Humanismus nestačí. Rozhovor se Slavojem Žižkem (Humanism is Not Enough: An Interview with Slavoj Žižek), Prague: Rybka Publishers, 2008.
Cesty z postmodernismu. Filosofická reflexe doby přechodu (Ways out of Postmodernism. A Philosophical Reflection of the Era of Transition), Prague: Rybka Publishers, 2012.
Kapitalismus jako zombie. Proč žijeme ve světě přízraků (Capitalism as a Zombie. Why Do We Live in the World of Spectres), Prague: Filosofia, 2012.

Major translations
Fromm, E.: Marx´s Concept of Man (Obraz člověka u Marxe), Luboš Marek, Brno 2004. 
Fabre, C.: Social Rights Under the Constitution: Government and the Decent Life (Ústavní zakotvení sociálních práv), FILOSOFIA, Prague 2004.
Žižek, S.: The Ticklish Subject: The Absent Centre of Political Ontology (Nepolapitelný subjekt. Chybějící střed politické ontologie), Brno: Luboš Marek 2007.
Adorno, Th. W. – Horkheimer, M.: Dialektik der Aufklärung (Dialektika osvícenství)  (with M. Váňa), OIKOYMENH, Prague 2009.
Adorno, T., Horkheimer, M.: Das Schema der Massenkultur, Kulturindustrie (Schéma masové kultury), OIKOYMENH, Prague 2009.

References

External links
Michael Hausers’s essay on the decline of liberal democracy 
(excerpt) Humanism is Not Enough: An Interview with Slavoj Žižek 
Declaration of the Jsme občané! initiative (in Czech)

1972 births
Living people
Czech philosophers
Academic staff of Charles University
Charles University alumni